Pwn is an Internet slang term meaning to "own" or to "outdo" someone or something.

Pwn or its derivations may also refer to 
Gaming, hacking, or Internet culture
 Gaming-pwnage, video game culture slang for beating someone at video games
 Have I Been Pwned?, a website that reports Internet security breaches
Pure Pwnage, an Internet series
Pwn2Own, a contest
Pwnage, the online identity of Samuel Anderson-Anderson, the protagonist in Nathan Hill's novel The Nix (2017)
Pwnie Awards
People
 Pwnsauce, the online identity of a leading hacktivist member of LulzSec

PWN may refer to 
 Patras Wireless Network, a wireless community network, operating in Patras, Greece
 Person with narcolepsy, as abbreviated by narcolepsy chat and support groups
 Phrack World News, a service of Phrack magazine
 Polish Scientific Publishers PWN (Wydawnictwo Naukowe PWN; until 1991 National Scientific Publishers PWN, PWN – Państwowe Wydawnictwo Naukowe), a Polish book publisher
 Pro Wrestling Noah, pro wrestling promotion
 Pulsar wind nebula, an astronomical phenomenon

pwn may refer to 
 Paiwan language (ISO 639-3).

See also
 Owned
 PowNed